Sahak I  was a catholicos of the Armenian Apostolic Church and the first of several catholicoi during the Albaniosid Dynasty in fourth century.

According to Faustus of Byzantium, a popular assembly selected Sahak I as the successor of Pharen I of Armenia after Pharen's death. Awags of the prince of Gardmanac'jor and ten other nakharars accompanied Sahak I to Caesarea in Cappadocia. There bishops ordained Sahak I as catholicos of Greater Armenia. Sahak I followed Pharen's work, but the king Tiran, the naxarars and the princes did not take his advice. During the reign of Arshak II, Saint Nerses I the Great replaced Sahak I.

However, according to the History of the Armenians of Movses Khorenatsi, Sahak I succeeded Saint Nerses I the Great and reigned from 373 to 377 AD. He was appointed by Pap without the permission of Caesarea's bishop council and succeeded by Zawen I.

Notes 

Catholicoi of Armenia
377 deaths
Year of birth unknown
4th-century archbishops
4th-century Armenian bishops